Hanan al-Shaykh  (born 12 November 1945, Beirut) is a Lebanese author of contemporary literature.

Biography 
Hanan al-Shaykh was born Beirut, Lebanon, in 1945, into a strict Shi'a
family. Her father and brother exerted strict social control over her during her childhood and adolescence. She attended the Almillah primary school for Muslim girls where she received a traditional education for Muslim girls, before continuing her education at the Ahliah school. She continued her gender-segregated education at the American College for Girls in Cairo, Egypt, graduating in 1966.

She returned to Lebanon to work for the Lebanese newspaper An-Nahar until 1975. She left Beirut again in 1975 at the outbreak of the Lebanese Civil War and moved to Saudi Arabia to work and write there. She now lives in London with her family.

Her daughter is Juman Malouf, a writer, illustrator and costume designer who is the romantic partner of American director Wes Anderson.

Major themes 
Al-Shaykh's literature follows in the footsteps of such contemporary Arab women authors as Nawal El Saadawi in that it explicitly challenges the roles of women in the traditional social structures of the Arab Middle East. Her work is heavily influenced by the patriarchal controls that were placed on her not only by her father and brother, but also within the traditional neighborhood in which she was raised. As a result, her work is a manifestation of a social commentary on the status of women in the Arab-Muslim world. She challenges notions of sexuality, obedience, modesty, and familiar relations in her work.

Her work often implies or states sexually explicit scenes and sexual situations which go directly against the social mores of conservative Arab society, which has led to her books being banned in the more conservative areas of the region including Arab countries in the Persian Gulf. In other countries, they are difficult to obtain because of censorship laws which prevent the Arabic translations from being easily accessible to the public. Specific examples include The Story of Zahra which includes abortion, divorce, sanity, children born outside of marriage, and sexual promiscuity, and Women of Sand and Myrrh which contains scenes of a romantic relationship between two of the main female protagonists.

In addition to her prolific writing on the condition of Arab women and her literary social criticism, she is also part of a group of authors writing about the Lebanese Civil War. Many literary critics cite that her literature is not only about the condition of women, but is also a human manifestation of Lebanon during the civil war.

Selected works

Work in Arabic 
Suicide of a Dead Man, 1970  (انتحار رجل ميت)
The Devil's Horse, 1975
The Story of Zahra, 1980    (حكاية زهرة)
The Persian Carpet in Arabic Short Stories, 1983
Scent of a Gazelle, 1988         (مسك الغزال)
Mail from Beirut, 1992            (بريد بيروت)
I Sweep the Sun Off Rooftops, 1994  (أكنس الشمس عن السطوح)
Two Women by the Sea, 2003 (امرأتان على شطىء البحر)

Works that have been translated into English from Arabic 
Women of Sand and Myrrh (Trans. 1992)
The Story of Zahra (Trans. 1994)
Beirut Blues (Trans. 1992)
Only in London  (Trans. 2001)
I Sweep the Sun Off Rooftops (Trans. 2002)
The Persian Carpet
The Locust and the Bird: My Mother's Story (Trans. 2009)

Works in English
 One Thousand and One Nights: A Retelling, Pantheon (2013) 
 The Occasional Virgin, Pantheon (2018)

References

External links 
 Hanan al-Shaykh biography at The Lebanese Women's Awakening
 The Locust and the Bird: My Mother's Story at amazon.com

1945 births
Living people
Feminist writers
Lebanese emigrants to the United Kingdom
Lebanese feminists
Lebanese novelists
Lebanese Shia Muslims
Lebanese women writers
Writers from Beirut